The IAAF World Marathon Cup was an international event organised by the International Association of Athletics Federations every two years.

From 1997 until 2011 (its final year) it was incorporated with IAAF World Championships in Athletics.

Editions

Medalists

Men

Women

Medal table
Men

Women

See also
IAAF Continental Cup
European Marathon Cup

References

External links
IAAF official site
IAAF WORLD MARATHON CUP at GBR Athletics
IAAF World Cup Marathon - Individual Medalists/Dates/Venues

 
Recurring sporting events established in 1985
Recurring events disestablished in 2011
Marathons
Marathon Cup
Defunct athletics competitions